The Masurian District, also known as the District of East Prussia, and designated as the 4th District, was a district that acted as an provisional administrative division of Poland, during the administration of the Provisional Government of the Republic of Poland in 1945, and the Provisional Government of National Unity from 1945 to 1946. It was centered around the areas of Masuria, Powiśle and Warmia. It was established as one of four provisional districts on 14 March 1945. On 25 September 1945, areas near its western border were incorporated into the Gdańsk Voivodeship, while the areas near its eastern border, to the Białystok Voivodeship. It existed until 28 June 1946, when it was abolished and replaced with the Olsztyn Voivodeship. The head of the district was the attorney-in-fact Stanisław Piaskowski.

Gallery

Notes

References 

States and territories established in 1945
States and territories disestablished in 1946
1945 establishments in Poland
1946 disestablishments in Poland
Districts of Poland (1945–1946)